Bhaktha Gowri (alt. Bhaktha Gauri) is a 1941 Indian Tamil language film directed by S. Notani. The film stars S. D. Subbaiah and U. R. Jeevarathinam.

Plot
Lord Shiva blesses the Saivaite couple (K. K. Perumal and P. A. Rajamani) with a girl child (U. R. Jeevarathinam). The girl falls in love with a Vaishnavaite boy (S. D. Subbaiah). The boy's mother (Paramakudi S. Sivabhaghyam) opposes their love as the girl is a Saivaite. After much trials and tribulations the boy and girl are married with Lord Shiva's blessings who shows to the world that Shiva and Vishnu are one and the same.

Cast
The list is adapted from The Hindu review article.

Male cast
S. D. Subbaiah
K. K. Perumal
C. V. V. Panthulu
Kali N. Rathnam
M. R. Swaminathan
T. S. Durairaj
L. Narayana Rao

Female cast
U. R. Jeevarathinam
P. A. Rajamani
C. T. Rajakantham
P. S. Sivabhaghyam

Production
The film was produced by T. R. Sundaram under his own banner Modern Theatres and was directed by S. Notani. P. A. Rajamani who featured as the mother of U. R. Jeevarathinam is the elder sister of actress and playback singer P. A. Periyanayaki. P. S. Sivabhaghyam, better known as Paramakudi Sivabhaghyam was famous for her gramophone records.

Soundtrack
S. Velsamy Kavi penned the lyrics. No single person was credited as the music composer. The group of instrumentalists are:
 T. M. Ibrahim... Organ, Piano
 B. Rangaiah Naidu... Clarinet
 M. K. Nadaraja Bhagavathar... Fiddle
 S. R. Marutha Pillai... Flute
 K. R. Harihara Iyer... Jalatharang
 S. Abdul Khader... Sarangi
 T. P. Chinniah... Tabela
 D. R. Rao... Gadam
 S. P. Ponraj... Udophon

The song "Theruvil varaandi, Velan thaeril varaandi", sung by U. R. Jeevarathinam is a hit even today.

Reception
Randor Guy, writing in 2010 said the film is "Remembered for the melodious music and the hit of the day, Theruvil varaandee'".

References

External links
 - song from the film

Indian black-and-white films
1941 films
1940s Tamil-language films